Langtang was a village development committee (VDC)  in Rasuwa District in the Bagmati Zone of northern Nepal. It was located within the Langtang valley. At the time of the 1991 Nepal census it had a population of 468 people living in 100 individual households.

Government
The purpose of Village Development Committees is to organise village people structurally at a local level and to create a partnership between the community and the public sector for improved service delivery system.  A VDC has a status as an autonomous institution and authority for interacting with the more centralised institutions of governance in Nepal.  In doing so, the VDC gives village people an element of control and responsibility in development, and also ensures proper utilization and distribution of state funds and a greater interaction between government officials, NGOs and agencies. The village development committees within a given area will discuss education, water supply, basic health, sanitation, and income and will also monitor and record progress which is displayed in census data.

In VDCs there is one elected chief, usually elected with over an 80% majority.  From each ward, there is also a chief that is elected along with these there are also four members elected or nominated.

Prior to the 2015 Nepal earthquake there was a clinic located in Langtang, which served the local villages. Prior to 2000, there was no medical care available in the region.

2015 Nepal earthquake 
The village was entirely destroyed by a massive avalanche resulting from an earthquake on 25 April 2015. Reports from the area indicate that the village has only one structure remaining, with significant parts of the village buried beneath a landslide.  most of the village's inhabitants are "presumed to have perished".

References

External links
 UN map of the municipalities of Rasuwa District

Populated places in Rasuwa District
Natural disaster ghost towns
Landslides in 2015
Destroyed towns